The Delaware Valley Association of Structural Engineers (DVASE) is a structural engineering association established in 1991. Its headquarters are in Fort Washington, Pennsylvania, and its member firms are located in Pennsylvania and New Jersey. It is officially the eastern chapter of the Structural Engineers Association of Pennsylvania. Initially a monthly discussion group for business and liability issues, DVASE has since grown and evolved to provide educational offerings.

See also
 National Council of Structural Engineers Associations

References

External links
 

American engineering organizations
Organizations established in 1991
Structural engineering
1991 establishments in the United States